Potkin is a surname of Russian origin. Notable people with the surname include:

 Alexander Potkin (born 1976), Russian far-right political leader
 Vladimir Potkin (born 1982), Russian chess grandmaster

See also
 

Russian-language surnames